A list of female castellans in Japanese history.

Definition 

The list includes the following persons:

 Women who inherited the leadership of a samurai clan.
 A woman who was named commander of the castle by a Daimyo.
 Due to the death of a male owner, his wife or daughter formally inherit the leadership of the castle.

The list does not include:

 Women who had great political power but were not formally clan or castle leaders.
 Reigning Empresses or Regents
 Women who was the owner of part or compartment of a castle, like Kodai-in who gave the eastern ward of Osaka Castle to Tokugawa Ieyasu.
 Women who received honorable titles, such as Lady Kasuga who was named '' Jōrō Otoshiyori '' (上 臈 御 年 寄) and commanded the Ōoku area of Edo Castle
 Buildings or areas that cannot be considered a Japanese castle.

List

Other evidence of female castellans 
A sequence of women who acted remarkably as castellans, without being a formal heiress, or female castellans where there is little detail about their administration, area and castle.

Sengoku period (1467–1603) 

 Akamatsu Tōshōin: She was a de facto Daimyo of the Akamatsu clan. She was a guardian of Akamatsu Yoshimura. After Yoshimura's death, Tōshōin took total control of the clan as the leader in 1521.
 Jukei-ni: She acted as guardian and adviser to Ujiteru, Yoshimoto and her grandson Imagawa Ujizane. She has spent four generations of daimyos and it is said that she was de facto the last Sengoku daimyo of the Imagawa clan.
 Ikeda Sen: ''Tōdaiki'' (当代記) describes that she owned lands with a revenue equivalent to 10,000 koku, like a minor daimyo.
Myorin: Luís Fróis describes that a woman was the ruler of an area that is currently Ōita city, that woman was probably Myorin. Her son inherited the clan leadership after the death of Yoshioka Akioki. Because he was very young, Myorin became the representative head of Tsurusaki castle as a counselor for her son. Cases like these were common in all of Japanese history.
Munakata Saikaku: In 1586, she was appointed leader of the Munataka clan by Toyotomi Hideyoshi, because of her efforts in the Kyushu campaign.
Yodo-dono: She formally received Yodo Castle in 1589. After Hideyoshi's death, she acted as guardian of his heir Toyotomi Hideyori. Following the fall of the Council of Five Elders that resulted in the Battle of Sekigahara, Yodo-dono becomes the chief representative of the Toyotomi clan and Osaka Castle.
Lady Nata: In Otomo Family Document (大友家文書録), it is described that she owned lands on the Kunisaki Peninsula, an area run by her family, the Nata clan.
Fujishiro Gozen: She was the female castellan of a minor castle, the Fujishiro-kan (藤代館) in Mutsu Province.

See also 
 Onna-musha
 Kunoichi
 Empress of Japan

Notes

References 

Castellans
C

Lists of women by occupation and nationality